Santa Cruz Church (Portuguese for 'Holy Cross Church';), also known as Kudi Chin, is a Roman Catholic church in Bangkok. It is in Khwaeng (sub-district) Wat Kanlaya of the Thon Buri District on the west bank of Chao Phraya River, in the neighbourhood known as Kudi Chin. A church was first built on the site, which had been granted to a community of Portuguese Catholics, around 1770. It was then the main Catholic church in Bangkok, and served as the seat of the Apostolic Vicariate of Siam until 1821, when Assumption Cathedral was completed. The current building, in Renaissance Revival style, was built in 1913–1916 to replace a second structure from 1845.

References

Roman Catholic churches in Bangkok
Renaissance Revival architecture in Thailand
Portuguese diaspora in Thailand
Unregistered ancient monuments in Bangkok
Roman Catholic churches completed in 1916
Buildings and structures on the Chao Phraya River
20th-century Roman Catholic church buildings in Thailand